George Dale "The Fox" Williams (November 5, 1917 – April 17, 1988) was a musician, composer, and an arranger for a number of major big bands, including Jimmie Lunceford, Glenn Miller, Gene Krupa, Sonny Dunham, and Ray Anthony.

Career
He wrote hit songs, including "Whamboogie" and "It Must Be Jelly ('Cause Jam Don't Shake like That)" for Glenn Miller, "Hamp's Boogie" for Lionel Hampton, "Gene's Boogie" for Krupa, as well as Anthony's hit songs "Lackawanna Local", "The Fox", and "The Bunny Hop" and most of Anthony's recorded arrangements. He wrote arrangements for Harry James, Vaughan Monroe, Charlie Ventura, and his  recording band, for which he produced two LPs and an EP in the late 1950s as a leader. In addition, he arranged and conducted the music for Barbra Streisand's first commercial single, "Happy Days Are Here Again". Williams was a ghostwriter for the arrangements on Jackie Gleason's television show and arranged Gleason's albums in the 1950s and 1960s.

Discography 
 The Fox in HiFi (Brunswick, 1955)
 Such Beautiful Music  (RCA Victor, 1956)
 Swing Classics in Stereo (United Artists, 1959)
 Put On Your Dancing Shoes (United Artists, 1960)

As Arranger or conductor
With Louis Bellson
Big Band Jazz from the Summit (Roulette, 1962)

With Roy Eldridge
Rockin' Chair (Clef, 1951)

References

Sources
Flower, John (1972). Moonlight Serenade: a bio-discography of the Glenn Miller Civilian Band. New Rochelle, NY: Arlington House. .
Miller, Glenn (1943). Glenn Miller's Method for Orchestral Arranging. New York: Mutual Music Society. ASIN: B0007DMEDQ
Simon, George Thomas (1971). Simon Says. New York: Galahad. .
Simon, George Thomas (1980). Glenn Miller and His Orchestra. New York: Da Capo paperback. .

1917 births
1988 deaths
20th-century American composers
American music arrangers
Jazz arrangers